The following are the national records in athletics in the Commonwealth of Dominica maintained by Dominica's national athletics federation: Dominica Athletics Association (DAA).

Outdoor
Key to tables:

+ = en route to a longer distance

h = hand timing

# = ratified by federation but not officially recognised by World Athletics

OT = oversized track (> 200m in circumference)

Men

Women

Indoor

Men

Women

References
General
Dominican Athletic Records - Outdoor 8 June 2013 updated
Specific

External links
DAA Official webpage

Dominica
Athletics
Records